Bernard Gallacher, OBE (born 9 February 1949) is a Scottish professional golfer.

Early life and amateur career
Gallacher was born in Bathgate, Scotland. He took up golf at the age of eleven. In 1965 he won the Lothians Golf Association Boys Championship. He won the 1967 Scottish Amateur Open Stroke Play Championship and turned professional the same year.

Professional career
He won the Sir Henry Cotton Rookie of the Year award in 1968. His first professional wins came in 1969; a pair of them in Zambia and another pair in Europe in the equivalent of European Tour events. (The European Tour wasn't established until 1972.) He finished 1969 as Order of merit winner earning the Harry Vardon Trophy.

He accumulated ten wins on the European Tour between 1974 and 1984 and finished in the top ten on the European Tour Order of Merit five times between 1972 and 1982, with a best placing of third in 1974.

In 1969, at the age of 20, Gallacher became the youngest man to represent Great Britain in the Ryder Cup up to that time. This record was subsequently beaten by Nick Faldo and others. He went on to play in the Ryder Cup eight times and was non-playing captain of the European Team in 1991, 1993 and 1995. All three of those matches were very close; Europe lost the first two but won the third.

After turning 50, Gallacher played on the European Seniors Tour.  His first senior win came at The Mobile Cup in 2002.

Private life
Gallacher was the professional at the Wentworth Club near London for 25 years until the end of 1996. His daughter Kirsty was a presenter on Sky Sports News for 20 years.

Gallacher also wrote a column for Scottish golf magazine bunkered from 1998 until 2008. In August 2014, Gallacher was one of 200 public figures who were signatories to a letter to The Guardian opposing Scottish independence in the run-up to September's referendum on that issue.

Amateur wins
1967 Scottish Amateur Open Stroke Play Championship

Professional wins (23)

European Tour wins (10)

European Tour playoff record (2–2)

Other wins (12)
1969 (4) Eagle Open, Cock o' the North, Schweppes PGA Championship, W.D. & H.O. Wills Tournament
1970 (1) Mufulira Open
1971 (1) Martini International
1973 (2) Coca-Cola Young Professionals' Championship, Scottish Professional Championship
1974 (1) Scottish Professional Championship
1977 (1) Scottish Professional Championship
1981 (1) Sanyo Open
1983 (1) Scottish Professional Championship

European Senior Tour wins (1)

Results in major championships

CUT = missed the half-way cut (3rd round cut in 1969 Open Championship)
"T" = tied
Note: Gallacher never played in the U.S. Open or the PGA Championship.

Team appearances
Ryder Cup (representing Great Britain and Ireland/Europe): 1969, 1971, 1973, 1975, 1977, 1979, 1981, 1983, 1991 (non-playing captain), 1993 (non-playing captain), 1995  (winners, non-playing captain)
World Cup (representing Scotland): 1969, 1971, 1974, 1982, 1983
Double Diamond International: 1971, 1972, 1973 (winners), 1974, 1975, 1976, 1977
Marlboro Nations' Cup/Philip Morris International (representing Scotland): 1973 (winners), 1976
Sotogrande Match/Hennessy Cognac Cup (representing Great Britain and Ireland): 1974 (winners), 1978 (winners), 1982 (winners), (representing Scotland) 1984 (captain)

See also

List of golfers with most European Tour wins

References

External links

Scottish male golfers
European Tour golfers
European Senior Tour golfers
Ryder Cup competitors for Europe
Officers of the Order of the British Empire
People from Bathgate
Sportspeople from West Lothian
Scottish people of Irish descent
1949 births
Living people